Collared wrigglers are perciform fishes in the family Xenisthmidae. They are native to the Indian and Pacific Oceans, where they are mostly reef-dwelling.

Species
The 10 species in 7 genera are:
 Genus Allomicrodesmus Schultz, 1966
 Allomicrodesmus dorotheae Schultz, 1966 
 Genus Gymnoxenisthmus Gill, Bogorodsky & Mal, 2014 
 Gymnoxenisthmus tigrellus Gill, Bogorodsky & Mal, 2014 
 Genus Kraemericus
 Kraemericus smithi Menon & Talwar, 1972
 Genus Paraxenisthmus Gill & Hoese, 1993
 Paraxenisthmus springeri Gill & Hoese, 1993 
 Genus Rotuma Springer, 1988
 Rotuma lewisi Springer, 1988 
 Genus Tyson Springer, 1983
 Tyson belos Springer, 1983 
 Genus Xenisthmus Snyder, 1908
Xenisthmus africanus Smith, 1958 (the flathead wriggler or African wriggler)
Xenisthmus balius Gill & Randall, 1994 
Xenisthmus chi Gill & Hoese, 2004 
Xenisthmus clarus (Jordan & Seale, 1906) 
Xenisthmus eirospilus Gill & Hoese, 2004 
Xenisthmus polyzonatus (Klunzinger, 1871) (the bull's-eye wriggler or polyzonate wriggler) is peach-coloured with a bull's-eye-like spot on its tail.
Xenisthmus semicinctus Gill & Hoese, 2004

References

 

 
Gobiiformes